Arthur Rue Decatur (January 14, 1894 – April 25, 1966) was a pitcher in Major League Baseball. He pitched from 1922 to 1927 for the Brooklyn Robins and the Philadelphia Phillies.

External links

1894 births
1966 deaths
Baseball players from Cleveland
Major League Baseball pitchers
Brooklyn Robins players
Philadelphia Phillies players
Talladega Indians players
Talladega Tigers players
Jacksonville Tarpons players
Albany Babies players
Nashville Vols players
Louisville Colonels (minor league) players
Newark Bears (IL) players
Rochester Red Wings players
Chattanooga Lookouts players